Gollini is an Italian surname. Notable people with the surname include:

Alfredo Gollini (1881–1957), Italian gymnast
Pierluigi Gollini (born 1995), Italian footballer

See also
Bollini
Golling

Italian-language surnames